Sinead Matthews (born )  is an English actress whose credits include film, television and stage. Her notable TV roles include Marcia Williams in The Crown.

She was born in Coventry, England, and attended Cardinal Wiseman Catholic School in that city. She studied A-level Drama at Stratford-upon-Avon College between 1996 and 1998. She graduated from RADA in 2003.

Career
She made her television debut in the 2004 costume drama He Knew He Was Right. In 2009 she starred in Our Class, a new play by Tadeusz Slobodzianek at the NT and in Penelope Skinner's 2010 play Eigengrau at the Bush Theatre. On 21 August 2016, Matthews played Hermia/Fairy/Mistress Quince in A Midsummer Night's Dream, composed by Felix Mendelssohn, at The Proms.

Filmography

Film

Television

Radio
 I Love Stephen Fry (2010) – Chloe
 Diary of a Nobody (2012) – Sarah
 All Those Women (2015) – Jen

Stage

References

External links
 
 Sinead Matthews credits at Hamilton Hodell (management company): separate buttons for Theatre, Television, Film, Short Film, Radio, Skills, Characteristics

1980 births
Living people
Actresses from Coventry
Alumni of RADA
English film actresses
English radio actresses
English stage actresses
English television actresses
English voice actresses
21st-century English actresses